The 1940 United States Senate elections in Arizona took place on November 5, 1940. Incumbent Democratic U.S. Senator Henry F. Ashurst ran for reelection to a sixth term, but was defeated in the Democratic primary to challenger Ernest McFarland.

The twenty-eight-year Democratic incumbent, Henry F. Ashurst, appeared to be unbeatable and did not launch an aggressive campaign to retain his seat. While Ashurst remained in Washington, D.C., McFarland canvassed the state, giving speeches on water issues and World War II in Europe. He defeated Ashurst in the primary and went on to win the general election, defeating Republican challenger Irving A. Jennings.

Democratic primary

Candidates
 Henry F. Ashurst, incumbent U.S. Senator
 Ernest McFarland, assistant attorney general of Arizona, judge of the superior court of Pinal County
 Henderson Stockton
 Robert E. Miller, candidate for U.S. Senate in 1938
 Erwin H. Karz, attorney

Results

Republican primary

Candidates
 Irving A. Jennings, Sr.
 Burt H. Clingan, Republican nominee for U.S. Senate in 1938

Results

General election

See also 
 United States Senate elections, 1940 and 1941

References

1940
Arizona
United States Senate